Soos Creek is a creek located in King County, Washington, which drains into the Green River which ends in the Puget Sound. The upper part of the creek is divided into Big Soos Creek and Little Soos Creek, which join together near State Route 516 in Covington. Big Soos originates from small ponds located in Cascade-Fairwood, while Little Soos originates from the Lake Youngs reservoir.

A salmon hatchery is located on the creek near its mouth east of Auburn.

Recreation

References

Rivers of King County, Washington